Apple cactus is a common name for several plants and may refer to:

Cereus repandus, Peruvian apple cactus
Harrisia, applecactus